The Girls Are Willing is a 1958 Danish comedy film directed by Gabriel Axel. It was chosen as Denmark's official submission to the 31st Academy Awards for Best Foreign Language Film, but did not manage to receive a nomination. It was also entered into the 8th Berlin International Film Festival.

Guld og grønne skove was only Gabriel Axel's third feature film as a director, and from it came out in 1958, it took exactly 30 years before in 1988 he won his Academy Award for Babette's Feast.

Plot 
The two small islands, Hvenø and Birkø, have been in a decade-long conflict, and it therefore creates big problems when three young men from one island falls in love with three beautiful, young girls from the neighbouring island. Nothing could be more unlikely than a marriage between the islands - let alone three! But one day oil is found on the first island - causing a veritable invasion of the US oil company, American Super Oil Company. And then the whole little sleepy community is turned completely upside down ...

Cast 
 Axel Bang - Sognerådsformand Kristian Kristiansen
 Henny Lindorff Buckhøj - Martha
 Verner Tholsgaard - Theo
 Ole Larsen - Postmester Lars Peter
 Else-Marie - Thyra
 Mogens Viggo Petersen - Ole
 Valsø Holm - Købmand Anton
 Cay Kristiansen - Hans
 Anna Henriques-Nielsen - Jensine
 Vilhelm Henriques - Organist Mattis
 Einar Reim - Pastor Breining
 Keld Markuslund - Skolelærer
 Karl Stegger - Sognefoged Søren
 Hanne Winther-Jørgensen - Rigmor
 Judy Gringer - Anna

See also 
 List of submissions to the 31st Academy Awards for Best Foreign Language Film

References

External links 
 
Guld og grønne skove at the Danish National Filmography

1958 films
1950s Danish-language films
1958 romantic comedy films
Films directed by Gabriel Axel
Danish romantic comedy films